Karl Schumm (16 April 1899 – 12 December 1962) was a German diver who competed in the 1928 Summer Olympics. In 1928 he finished sixth in the 10 metre platform event.

References

1899 births
1962 deaths
German male divers
Olympic divers of Germany
Divers at the 1928 Summer Olympics
20th-century German people